Kadışehri is a town and district of Yozgat Province in the Central Anatolia region of Turkey. Neighbouring districts are Zile on the north, Akdağmadeni and Saraykent on the south, Çekerek on the west and Sulusaray on the east. According to 2000 census, population of the district is 23,317 of which 5,200 live in the town of Kadışehri.

Villages
The district of Kadışehri has 31 villages.

Çamsaray, Kadışehri
Aşağıkızılöz, Kadışehri
Belören, Kadışehri
Buzlukçepni, Kadışehri
Derbent, Kadışehri
Dikmesöğüt, Kadışehri
Dikmesöğüt, Kadışehri
Elmalı, Kadışehri
Elmalıçiftliği, Kadışehri
Elmalıütüğü, Kadışehri
Gümüşdiğin, Kadışehri
Gümüşsu, Kadışehri
Halıköy, Kadışehri
Hanözü, Kadışehri
Hanözü, Kadışehri
Kabalı, Kadışehri
Kemalli, Kadışehri
Kıyılı, Kadışehri
Ovacık, Kadışehri
Seyhan, Kadışehri
Vasfibey, Kadışehri
Yakacık, Kadışehri
Yangı, Kadışehri
Yanık, Kadışehri
Yavıhasan, Kadışehri
Yelten, Kadışehri
Yoncalık, Kadışehri
Yukarıkızılöz, Kadışehri
Örencik, Kadışehri
Akçakale, Kadışehri
Üçağaç, Kadışehri

Notes

References

External links
 District governor's official website 
 District municipality's official website 
 General information on Kadışehri 
 Image gallery of Kadışehri

Populated places in Yozgat Province
Districts of Yozgat Province